The 2017 Ladbrokes World Series of Darts Finals was the third staging of the tournament, organised by the Professional Darts Corporation. The tournament took place in the Braehead Arena, Glasgow, Scotland, between 3–5 November 2017. It featured a field of 24 players.

Michael van Gerwen was the defending champion after beating Peter Wright 11–9 in the previous year's final, and he retained his title for a third consecutive year, by defeating Gary Anderson 11–6 in the final.

Prize money
The total prize money increased from £155,000 to £250,000, with the winner's prize being upped from £30,000 to £50,000.

Qualification and format

The top eight players from the seven World Series events of 2017 are seeded for this tournament (with the exception of Phil Taylor, who declined his invite for the tournament). They are:

2017 Dubai Duty Free Darts Masters
2017 Shanghai Darts Masters
2017 US Darts Masters
2017 Auckland Darts Masters
2017 Melbourne Darts Masters
2017 Perth Darts Masters
2017 German Darts Masters

In addition, four players were invited as international invitations, as were the next four highest ranked players from the PDC Order of Merit following the 2017 World Grand Prix on 9 October 2017. Another eight places were awarded in a qualifying event that took place in Barnsley on 9 October 2017.

The following players qualify for the tournament:

Draw

References 

World Series of Darts
World Series of Darts
+2017
World Series of Darts
International sports competitions in Glasgow